Aite or AITE may refer to:

Academy of Information Technology and Engineering
Aïté, a village near Kayes in western Mali
Alternate spelling of the Greek goddess Atë